Elma Saiz Delgado (born 2 December 1975) is a Navarrese politician, Minister of Economy and Finance of Navarre since August 2019, and Spokesperson of the Government of Navarre since September 2022.

References

1975 births
Spanish Socialist Workers' Party politicians
Government ministers of Navarre
Living people
Politicians from Navarre